The canton of Lorris is a canton of the Loiret département, in the Centre-Val de Loire région of France. 37 of its 38 communes are part of the arrondissement of Montargis.

Communes
Since the French canton reorganisation which came into effect in March 2015, the communes of the canton of Lorris are:

Aillant-sur-Milleron
Auvilliers-en-Gâtinais
Beauchamps-sur-Huillard
Bellegarde
Chailly-en-Gâtinais
La Chapelle-sur-Aveyron
Chapelon
Le Charme
Châtenoy
Châtillon-Coligny
Cortrat
Coudroy
La Cour-Marigny
Dammarie-sur-Loing
Fréville-du-Gâtinais
Ladon
Lorris
Mézières-en-Gâtinais
Montbouy
Montcresson
Montereau
Moulon
Nesploy
Nogent-sur-Vernisson
Noyers
Oussoy-en-Gâtinais
Ouzouer-des-Champs
Ouzouer-sous-Bellegarde
Presnoy
Pressigny-les-Pins
Quiers-sur-Bézonde
Saint-Hilaire-sur-Puiseaux
Saint-Maurice-sur-Aveyron
Sainte-Geneviève-des-Bois
Thimory
Varennes-Changy
Vieilles-Maisons-sur-Joudry
Villemoutiers

Mayors of the canton of Lorris
 November 10, 1833 - July 7, 1850, Pierre Barthélémy Garnier, doctorate in Medicine and the mayor of Montargis
 July 7, 1850 - June 15–17, 1861, Louis Henri Prochasson,
 June 15–17, 1861 - June 12, 1870, Michel Félix de Violaine, inspector of the forests
 June 12, 1870 - June 30, 1901, Charles Joseph Nouette-Delorme, doctorate in medicine and mayor of Ouzouer-des-Champs
 June 30, 1901 - December 14, 1919, Louis Lucien Naudin
 December 14, 1919 - January 5, 1936, Marceau Thomas
 January 5, 1936 - March 7, 1937 - Constant Renard
 March 7, 1937, Constant Leturcq
 1996 -, Guy Parmentier

References

Lorris
1833 establishments in France